The Six Days of Montreal was a six-day track cycling race held annually in the Montreal Forum, Canada, from 1929 to 1942 and from 1963 to 1980.

37 editions were organized during these two periods. William Peden holds the record for most victories with 7.

Winners

External links 

Cycle races in Canada
Six-day races
Recurring sporting events established in 1929
Recurring sporting events disestablished in 1980
1929 establishments in Canada
1980 disestablishments in Canada
Defunct cycling races in Canada
Sports competitions in Montreal

References